A Makura-Nage is a game from Japan in which children throw pillows at each other. A typical occasion to play it is after the futon are prepared (especially after the official lights-off time) in summer camp.

While a pillow fight mainly takes the form of beating each other with pillows, Japanese Makura-Nage is a game in which players mainly throw pillows to each other. The word "makura" means "pillow", "nage" means "throwing".

There were no rules for Makura-Nage, but today some Japanese ryokan hold Makura-Nage Games (まくら投げ大会) for advertisement.

In many anime and manga, a Makura-Nage scene creates a nostalgic atmosphere when describing children.

See also
 Pillow fight

External links
 Makura Nage 枕投げ (in Italian)
 The まくら投げ - 2005 archive (in Japanese)

Japanese games
Children's games
Pillow fight